Adam Józef Świtek (24 December 1901 – 19 March 1960) was a Polish boxer who competed in the 1924 Summer Olympics. In 1924 he was eliminated in the first round of the welterweight class after losing his bout to Hugh Haggerty of the United States.

References

External links
 

1901 births
1960 deaths
Welterweight boxers
Olympic boxers of Poland
Boxers at the 1924 Summer Olympics
People from Inowrocław
Sportspeople from Kuyavian-Pomeranian Voivodeship
Polish male boxers